It's a Wonderful Feeling is the second and final studio album by J-pop band Ramjet Pulley. It was released on January 29, 2003, under the Giza Studio label. This is the last work released by Ramjet Pulley. Since then they've been on unannounced indefinite hiatus.

Promotion
The album consists of two previously released final singles, such as Change The World and Flower. While Change the World didn't receive any commercial promotion, the final single Flower was used as an ending theme for Nihon TV program The Sunday. The album track everything was used as a commercial television song of Dome.

The single Change The World has received new remix track under subtitle 80.5 remix by Akira. Find My Way is a coupling song from their fifth single. Three songs out of fourteen are instrumentals by Japanese arranger Satoru Kobayashi.

Both of the leading singles were recorded with full music videoclip and are included in the label's compilation album Giza Studio Masterpiece Blend 2002 and I'll fall in love again in Giza Studio Masterpiece Blend 2003.

Commercial performance
The album charted #84 rank on Oricon for first week with 3,014 sold copies. The album charted for two weeks and totally sold 4,357 copies.

Track listing

Personnel
Credits adapted from the CD booklet of It's a Wonderful Feeling.

Akiko Matsuda - vocals
Satomi Makoshi - songwriting
Kazunobu Mashima - composing
Satoru Kobayashi - arranging
Rubik's cube - remixing
Akira - remixing

Yosuke Nishimura - recording engineer
Katsuo Urano - recording engineer
Akio Nakajima - mixing engineer
Taku Oyabu - mixing engineer
Masahiro Shimada - mastering engineer
Noriko Ohgami – art direction
Kanonji - producing

References 

2003 albums
Being Inc. albums
Giza Studio albums
Japanese-language albums